The 64th Primetime Emmy Awards, honoring the best in prime time television programming from June 1, 2011 until May 31, 2012, were held on Sunday, September 23, 2012 at the Nokia Theatre in Downtown Los Angeles, California. ABC televised the ceremony in the United States. Comedian and late-night talk show host Jimmy Kimmel hosted the Primetime Emmys for the first time. Kimmel and Kerry Washington announced the nominations on July 19, 2012. Nick Offerman was originally scheduled to co-announce the nominations, but had to cancel due to travel delays. The Creative Arts Emmy Awards ceremony was held on September 15 and was televised on September 22, 2012 on ReelzChannel.

The award for Outstanding Drama Series went to Showtime crime drama Homeland, the first for that network, and which broke Mad Mens four-year hold on the award; while the Outstanding Comedy Series award went for the third year in a row to ABC's Modern Family. This was the first ceremony that none of the four major American broadcasting TV networks were nominated in the categories of Outstanding Drama Series, Outstanding Lead Actor in a Drama Series, and Outstanding Supporting Actor in a Drama Series. For Britain, the ceremony was noted for the successes of actors Damian Lewis of Homeland and Maggie Smith of Downton Abbey.

Of the latter, Dame Maggie not only was PBS' first win in her category, she had won the previous year, for the same role in another category. Hers was also the first win in a major acting category for a Drama Series for PBS since 1975.

Mad Men set a new record for the largest "shutout" in Emmy history, receiving nominations for 17 awards and winning none. This broke the previous record of 16 nominations without a win, set by Northern Exposure in 1993 and The Larry Sanders Show in 1997. This record was broken by The Handmaid's Tale in 2021, which did not win any of its 21 nominations that year.

Winners and nominees

Winners are listed first and highlighted in bold:

Programs

Acting

Lead performances

Supporting performances

Hosting

Directing

Writing

Most major nominations
By network
 HBO – 27
 PBS – 17
 ABC – 16
 AMC / NBC – 15
 CBS – 14
 Showtime – 9

By program
 Downton Abbey (PBS) / Modern Family (ABC) / Mad Men (AMC) - 9
 Game Change (HBO) / Hatfields & McCoys (History) – 7
 Breaking Bad (AMC) – 6

Most major awards
By network
 HBO – 6
 ABC – 5
 Showtime – 4
 CBS / FX – 3
 History – 2

By program
 Game Change (HBO) / Homeland (Showtime) / Modern Family (ABC) – 4

Notes

Presenters
The awards were presented by the following:

In Memoriam
Before the recorded segment, Ron Howard presented a tribute to Andy Griffith.

The people tributed in the segment included:

 Marvin Hamlisch
 Davy Jones
 Hal Kanter
 Richard Dawson
 Jim Paratore
 Lee Rich
 Sherman Hemsley
 Phyllis Diller
 William Asher
 Celeste Holm
 Michael Clarke Duncan
 Lupe Ontiveros
 James Farentino
 Irving Fein
 Heavy D
 Chad Everett
 Don Cornelius
 Robert Hegyes
 Ron Palillo
 Robert Easton
 Andy Rooney
 John Rich
 Michele O'Callaghan
 Steve Jobs
 Gil Cates
 Bob Henry
 Al Freeman Jr.
 Patrice O'Neal
 Whitney Houston
 Ben Gazzara
 Donna Summer
 Tony Scott
 Kathryn Joosten
 Paul Bogart
 William Windom
 Norman Felton
 Frank Pierson
 Mike Wallace
 Ernest Borgnine
 Harry Morgan
 Dick Clark

Televised ceremony ratings
The ceremony, which was televised by ABC on September 23, 2012, was watched by 13.26 million viewers. The event's red carpet proceedings were watched by 5.63 million.

References

External links
 Emmys.com list of 2012 Nominees & Winners
 Academy of Television Arts and Sciences website
 

064
Primetime Emmy Awards, 64th
2012 in American television
Primetime Emmy
2012 awards in the United States
September 2012 events in the United States
Television shows directed by Glenn Weiss
Works by Jeff Loveness